This is a list of cities in Somalia by population. , the country has an estimated population of 14,243,849 inhabitants. According to the Central Intelligence Agency, the total population count in Somalia is complicated by internal movements of nomads and individuals displaced during the civil war. CIA estimates are extrapolated from the Somali national census of February 1975. , towns are defined as all communities with 5,000 or more persons, as well as any regional or district headquarters, regardless of size. There is little reliable statistical information on urbanization in Somalia. However, rough estimates have been made indicating a rate of urbanization of 7.2% per annum (2016–10 est.), with many towns quickly growing into cities.

List of cities in Somalia by populations.

See also 
 Demographics of Somalia

References 

Somalia. The World Factbook. Central Intelligence Agency.

External links

Somalia Cities/Magaalooyinka Soomaaliya

 
Somalia geography-related lists
Somalia